Kälberbuckel is a mountain of Bavaria, Germany. It is located
west of the village of Achslach in the Bavarian Forest. The mountain is almost entirely forested.

The nearest neighboring mountains are Predigtstuhl (1024 m) to the northwest and Hirschenstein (1092 m) to the southeast, along the same ridge.

Mountains of Bavaria
Mountains of the Bavarian Forest